Entomoliva mirabilis is a species of sea snail, a marine gastropod mollusk in the family Ancillariidae.

Description
The length of the shell attains 25.2 mm.

Distribution
This marine species occurs off New Caledonia.

References

External links
 Bouchet P. & Kilburn R.N. (1991). A new genus of Ancillinae from New Caledonia, with the description of two new species. Bulletin du Museum National d'Histoire Naturelle 4A12 Page 531-539
 MNHN, Paris: holotype

Ancillariidae
Gastropods described in 1991